is a song by Japanese pop group B.B.Queens, serving as their debut single on April 4, 1990. It was used as the original ending theme of the anime series Chibi Maruko-chan. On July 9, 1990, "Odoru Pompokolin" reached the top of the Oricon Singles Charts, and again on July 23, on August 20, before serving as the number 1 weekly song throughout the month of September 1990. It ultimately remained on the charts for a total of 54 weeks, sold 1.9 million copies, and won both record of the year and pop rock song of the year at the 32nd Japan Record Awards as well as the 1991 JASRAC Award.

The song was composed and arranged by Tetsuro Oda with lyrics by Momoko Sakura, author of Chibi Maruko-chan.

"Odoru Pompokolin" became very popular as an anime theme song, reaching number 8 on a list of 100 unforgettable anime theme songs compiled by TV Asahi and then at number 1 on a list of the top 20 anime theme songs of the 1990s, also compiled by TV Asahi.

Covers include an uptempo happy hardcore version which was featured on Anime Speed, a heavy metal cover by Animetal on their fanclub exclusive "For the Bravehearts Only!" single, an English-language version titled "Dancing Pompokolin" by Captain Jack which was featured in the game Dance Dance Revolution and other music games, a version by ManaKana used as the Chibi Maruko-chan opening theme song from 1998 to 2000, and a cover by Kaela Kimura on her album 5 Years which has been used as the opening for the anime throughout 2010.

In 2011, B.B.Queens reunited and recorded a new version of "Odoru Pompokolin" to commemorate the 25th anniversary of Chibi Maruko-chans initial manga release. This version subtitled , coupled with a new version of Keiko Utoku and Fusanosuke Kondo's "Good-by Morning", was released as a single on May 1, 2011. This new version of the song also entered use as the Chibi Maruko-chan theme beginning with the May 1, 2011, broadcast of the new season.

On August 13, 2014, the girl-group E-girls released a cover of "Odoru Ponpokorin" as their 10th single, coupled with a cover of Dreams Come True's  as the B-side. This version of the song was used for three months as the opening song of the anime. The single sold 43,653 in its first week.

In May 2016, TWICE Japanese members Sana and Momo did a musical version of the said song. The Thailand version was then used for their first concert in Bangkok.

In 2019, Japanese idol group Momoiro Clover Z released a version with an accompanying music video.

References

1990 songs
1990 debut singles
Anime songs
Songs written by Tetsurō Oda
Oricon Weekly number-one singles
Chibi Maruko-chan
E-girls songs